IRIB Pooya & Nahal, is an Islamic Republic of Iran Broadcasting television channel. The channel was established on July 18, 2012, as IRIB Pooya, and reformed on September 23, 2015.

The channel consists of three subchannels: Pooya, which is focused on 6- years old viewers, started on September 23, 2015, which runs everyday from 8 A.M. to 2 P.M., Nahal (which means plant in Persian), which is focused on 6+ years old viewers, started on September 23, 2015, as IRIB Koodak, and got its current name and logo on April 18, 2016, running everyday from 2 P.M. to 10 P.M., and the teen channel, which is a separate channel and titled Omid (means hope), launched on September 20, 2016.

Current programming

Current programming (IRIB Pooya) 
 Monk Little Dog
 Baby Jake
 Pocoyo
 Waybuloo
 Henry Hugglemonster
 The Backyardigans
 Chloe's Closet
 Sarah and Duck
 Pingu
 Footy Pups
 Driver Dan's Story Train
 Show Me Show Me
 Caillou
 Masha and the Bear
 Miss Spider's Sunny Patch Friends
 Uki
 Chuggington
 Numberblocks
 Musti
 Peppa Pig
 Ben & Holly's Little Kingdom
 Fifi and the Flowertots
 In the Night Garden...
 Boo!
 Molang

Current programming (IRIB Nahal) 
 Mouk
 Mia the Mouse
 Shaun the Sheep
 Vicky the Viking
 Buttercup Wood
 Postman Pat
 Roary the Racing Car
 Timon & Pumbaa
 The Looney Tunes Show
 Numb Chucks
 Bunsen Is a Beast
 Turbo F.A.S.T.
 Camp Lazlo
 Jimmy Two-Shoes
 Teenage Mutant Ninja Turtles
 Miraculous: Tales of Ladybug & Cat Noir
 Oggy and the Cockroaches
 Space Goofs
 The Garfield Show
 Geronimo Stilton
 AI Football GGO
 The Boss Baby: Back in Business

External links
IRIB Pooya Official website
IRIB Nahal Official website
IRIB Pooya & Nahal Live streaming

Television stations in Iran
Persian-language television stations
Islamic Republic of Iran Broadcasting
Television channels and stations established in 1994
Mass media in Tehran
Children's television networks
1994 establishments in Iran